Benito Elizalde Etxezarreta (born 15 October 1961) is a Spanish lightweight rower. He won a gold medal at the 1983 World Rowing Championships in Duisburg with the lightweight men's eight.

References

1961 births
Living people
Spanish male rowers
World Rowing Championships medalists for Spain
20th-century Spanish people